Neumark is a family name of Scandinavian or Germanic origin. The name can be an Americanized form of the Scandinavian name, Nymark, a common habitual name from farms named with "Ny-Mark" or "new field".  

Neumark also derives from Germanic origin and relates to persons from the Neumark region in Brandenburg.  

In addition, Neumark can be an Ashkenazi Jewish surname derived from "Nay-Mark" (Yiddish: "new market").  Naymark was a name adopted by merchants such as Aharon Naymark who was a famous fabrics merchant: his descendants today are famous jewelers.

Neumark 

 David Neumark (1959–), American economist
 Fritz Neumark (1900–1991), German economist
 Gabi Neumark (1946–2000), Israeli basketball player
 Georg Neumark (1621–1681)
 Gertrude Neumark (1927–2010), American physicist
 Mark Naimark (1909–1978), Soviet mathematician
  (1866–1943), German industrialist

External links 
 Naymark Genealogy and Family Tree Resources

German-language surnames
Jewish surnames
Yiddish-language surnames